Montrond may refer to the following places in France:

 Montrond, Hautes-Alpes, a commune in the department of Hautes-Alpes
 Montrond, Jura, a commune in the department of Jura
 Montrond-le-Château, a commune in the department of Doubs
 Montrond-les-Bains, a commune in the department of Loire
 Saint-Amand-Montrond, a commune in the department of Cher